Knut Hagrup (né Hagerup-Svendsen; 13 November 1913 – 15 May 2003) was a Norwegian aviator. He was born in Bergen to Henry Lie-Svendsen and Ebba Hagerup . He served with the exiled Norwegian Armed Forces and the Royal Norwegian Air Force in the United Kingdom from 1941 to 1945, as a pilot and a technical officer. He was assigned with the Scandinavian Airlines from 1946, and was manager of the company from 1969 to 1978. After his retirement he was appointed professor at the Northrop University in Inglewood, California. Among his publications are Flyet i fare from 1975, and his thesis How the aerospace-industry of western Europe will survive from 1981.

References

1913 births
2003 deaths
Norwegian aviators
Norwegian Army Air Service personnel of World War II
Norwegian World War II pilots
Royal Norwegian Air Force personnel of World War II
Norwegian Royal Air Force pilots of World War II
Norwegian expatriates in the United States
Military personnel from Bergen